was a Japanese man who went on a stabbing spree in the city of Tsuchiura on March 23, 2008, which left a 27-year-old man dead and seven others wounded. Police arrested Kanagawa, then 24, who was wanted in an earlier slaying of a 72-year-old man. The man told the investigators that he "just wanted to kill anyone". The suspect, who carried two knives, stabbed the 27-year-old man to death and hurt at least seven others, while the victims were walking along a short hallway connecting Arakawaoki Station. The 27-year-old died as he was being rushed to a nearby hospital. Police said that Kanagawa liked games and that he hid out in Akihabara while escaping. Some media outlets claimed that he murdered people under the influence of Ninja Gaiden: Dragon Sword. He reportedly sought capital punishment. Tomohiro Katō, who committed the Akihabara massacre, is alleged to have posted a message which referred to his case.

The Mito District Court sentenced him to death on December 18, 2009, and he was executed by hanging on February 21, 2013.

See also 
List of executions in Japan
Video game controversy

References 

1983 births
2013 deaths
21st-century criminals
21st-century executions by Japan
Japanese people convicted of murder
People executed by Japan by hanging
People convicted of murder by Japan
People executed for murder
Executed Japanese people
Mass stabbings in Japan
Knife attacks